Sarah Avraham (born 1993/1994) is an Indian-born Israeli Muay Thai kickboxer.  She converted to Judaism and moved to Israel after the 2008 Mumbai attacks.

Avraham was the 2012 Israeli women's champion in Thai boxing, in the  weight class. She is also the 2014 World Muaythai Federation pro-am women's world champion in the 57–63.5 kg (125–140 lbs) class.

Early life

Avraham was born in Bombay, India, to a Hindu father who is a physician, Dr. Aaron Avraham (formerly Hagirdas Pradesh) and a Christian mother who was a nurse. Her family was close friends with Gavriel Holtzberg and his wife Rivka, who were killed in the November 2008 Mumbai attacks, by terrorists who attacked the Mumbai Chabad House where the couple served as emissaries. Avraham was 14 years old at the time.

Immigration to Israel
A year after the attack, she and her family converted and moved to Israel. They settled in the West Bank  Israeli settlement of Kiryat Arba, south of Jerusalem, on the outskirts of Hebron, where she now lives.

She is now a religious Orthodox Jew, and studies at an ulpana in Kiryat Arba.  Avraham also volunteers as a firefighter, and has taken part in scores of firefighting operations.

Avraham is considering studying medicine, or she may eventually become a full-time firewoman.

Thai boxing career
While attending a Kiryat Arba school for religious girls, Avraham made the decision to participate in sports. Michael Pollack, a fitness trainer from nearby Hebron's Jewish neighborhood, melded kickboxing into her sports training.  Pollack put Thai boxing coach Eddie Yusopov and Avraham in contact with each other, and Yusopov became her trainer.

Avraham trains in Muay Thai boxing five times a week, at the boxing center at Jerusalem's Teddy Stadium.  As is the case with most Israeli athletes, she does not receive any funding. To pay for her training (NIS 230 a month) and trips abroad for competitions, since she does not like to ask for money, she cleans houses and also works as a dog walker and waitress.  In addition, Avraham hitchhikes to her practices in Jerusalem, as she does not have money to take the bus.  Because she is religious, she brings kosher food with her when she travels to fights.

2012 Israeli Champion
In September 2012, Avraham won the Israeli national women’s Thai boxing championship in her weight class of 57–63 kilos (125–140 pounds), at the age of 18.

2014 World Champion
In early 2014, while still in high school Avraham won the Women's World Thai-Boxing Championship in Bangkok, Thailand, in her 57–63 kilos (125–140 pounds) weight class.

See also
List of select Jewish mixed martial artists

References

External links
"Ex-Hindu is Israel's Thai-boxing queen" (video), Times of Israel, September 23, 2012
"Sara Avraham – כתבה בערוץ הראשון" (video; Hebrew and English), May 2013

Living people
Indian emigrants to Israel
Indian Orthodox Jews
Indian former Hindus
Israeli female kickboxers
Israeli Muay Thai practitioners
Israeli Orthodox Jews
Martial artists from Mumbai
People from Kiryat Arba
Jewish martial artists
Converts to Orthodox Judaism
Israeli people of Indian descent
Female Muay Thai practitioners
Sportswomen from Maharashtra
Year of birth missing (living people)
People associated with the 2008 Mumbai attacks